Uranium City Water Aerodrome  is located adjacent to Uranium City, Saskatchewan, Canada.

See also 
 List of airports in Saskatchewan
 Uranium City Airport

References 

Registered aerodromes in Saskatchewan
Seaplane bases in Saskatchewan
Uranium City, Saskatchewan